The Penghu Living Museum (PHLM) is a museum about the customs and culture of Penghu in Magong City, Penghu County, Taiwan.

History
In 2001, the Taipei National University of the Arts was commissioned to do the preliminary study and to lay the foundation for the project launching. The construction was completed in 2009 and the museum was opened on 3 April 2010.

Exhibitions

Second floor
 The Ocean and Penghu
 Penghu's History of Glamour
 May Heaven Bless Our Land
 Folk Customs and Lifestyle

Third floor
 The Fruit of Good Fortune is Ever Growing
 Trivia of Penghu Lifestyle
 Forum and Theater

See also
 List of museums in Taiwan

References

External links

 

2010 establishments in Taiwan
Museums established in 2009
Living museums
Local museums in Taiwan
Museums established in 2010
Museums in Penghu County